Hârtiești is a commune in Argeș County, Muntenia, Romania. It is composed of four villages: Dealu, Hârtiești, Lespezi and Lucieni. It also included the villages of Bârzești, Huluba and Vulturești until 2003, when these were split off to form Vulturești Commune.

References

Communes in Argeș County
Localities in Muntenia